Stefan Paštrović (1597) was a Serbian Orthodox hieromonk of Monastery of Gradište in Buljarica. He descended from the Paštrovići coastal tribe in modern-day Montenegro. According to some sources his position was hegumen.

Paštrović co-authored two manuscripts and engaged hieromonk Sava from Visoki Dečani to print them in Venice. Sava printed Proceedings for travelers or Prayer Book of Stefan Paštrović and First Serbian Primer in the printing house Rampazetto and Heirs in Venice. "Prayer Book was published" on 19 May 1597 and "Serbian Primer" was printed a day later.

See also
Božidar Vuković
Božidar Goraždanin
Đurađ Crnojević
Stefan Marinović
Hieromonk Makarije
Hieromonk Mardarije
Hegumen Mardarije
Vićenco Vuković
Hieromonk Pahomije
Trojan Gundulić
Andrija Paltašić
Jakov of Kamena Reka
Bartolomeo Ginammi who followed Zagurović's footsteps reprinting Serbian books.
Dimitrije Ljubavić
Inok Sava

References

Sources

Further reading
 
 Monastery of Gradište: http://www.budva.travel/en/what-to-see/kultura-i-bastina/the-monastery-of-gradiste/

External links 
 Skida se veo tajne sa „Prvog srpskog bukvara”, Politika 31 May 2011

16th-century Serbian people
16th-century Eastern Orthodox Christians
16th-century writers
Serbian monks
Serbian writers
Serbian printers
Serbian Orthodox clergy
Serbs from the Ottoman Empire
Venetian Slavs
16th-century Christian monks
Serb priests